Frank Bradshaw Corboy (August 12, 1888 – March 21, 1948) was an American football, basketball, and baseball coach and college athletics administrator. He was an alumnus of the University of Pittsburgh, Muhlenberg College and the University of Toulouse, in France.

Coaching career
Corboy was the head football coach at Elon University in Elon, North Carolina. He held that position for six seasons, from 1920 until 1925.  His coaching record at Elon was 17–31–3.

Death
Corboy died in Orlando, Florida in 1948.

Head coaching record

Football

References

External links
 

1888 births
1948 deaths
Basketball coaches from Pennsylvania
Elon Phoenix athletic directors
Elon Phoenix baseball coaches
Elon Phoenix football coaches
Elon Phoenix men's basketball coaches
People from Bedford, Pennsylvania